Wathiyaqucha (Quechua wathiya roasted potatoes, a traditional dish, qucha lake, Hispanicized spelling Bateacocha) is a  mountain in the Andes of Peru. It is situated in the Lima Region, Cajatambo Province, Gorgor District, and in the Huaura Province, Ambar District. Wathiyaqucha lies between Wanki  in the west and Puka Parya in the east.

References

Mountains of Peru
Mountains of Lima Region